One flat may refer to:

F major, a major musical key with one flat
D minor, a minor musical key with one flat